Banpo Station is a metro station on Seoul Subway Line 7 located in Jamwon-dong, Seocho-gu, Seoul. Despite its name, the station is not located in Banpo-dong, but instead in Jamwon. It has 6 entrances that they are all right side entrance and they have screen doors right before entering the train. It takes 4~8 minutes between 2 trains and next stations are Nonhyeon and Seoul Express Bus Terminal. It is only 500m long between Banpo station and two other Stations next to it. The station number is 733.

Station layout

Vicinity
 Exit 1 : Wonchon Elementary & Middle Schools
 Exit 2 : Way to Banpo 1 dong
 Exit 3 : Junction of Express Bus Terminal, townoffice of Banpo 1 dong
 Exit 4 : Junction of Express Bus Terminal, townoffice of Banpo 1 dong (opposite side from Exit 4)
 Exit 5 : Kyongwon Middle School
 Exit 6 : Jamwon-dong, Banpo Social Welfare Center

Passengers

Places around station 
 New Town
 Banpo Xi Apartment
 Donga Apartment
 Kyongwon Middle School
 Seoul Express Bus Terminal
 Banpo Bus Station

History 
SMRT built Banpo Station and they started to run Banpo Station on August 1, 2000. Banpo Station started to run when line number 7 started.

References 

 
 
 
 

Metro stations in Seocho District
Seoul Metropolitan Subway stations
Railway stations opened in 2000